Tjitske Siderius (born 24 September 1981, in Groenlo) is a Dutch politician. She was a member of the House of Representatives of the Netherlands for the Socialist Party between 3 September 2013 and 26 November 2013, temporarily replacing Sadet Karabulut, who went on maternity leave. From 6 February 2014 Siderius temporarily replaced Renske Leijten who went on maternity leave. When Paulus Jansen resigned in April 2014, Siderius became his permanent replacement on 14 May 2014. Henri Swinkels then became the temporary replacement for Leijten. Her term in the House ended on 23 March 2017.

Siderius studied management, economy and law at HU University of Applied Sciences Utrecht between 2001 and 2001, she continued studying at Windesheim University of Applied Sciences on the topic of personnel and work between 2001 and 2005.

Siderius had been a staff employee for the Socialist Party fraction in the House of Representatives before she became a temporary member of the House herself. She was member of the municipal council of Zwolle between March 2006 and September 2014.

During the 2012 general election Siderius was number 18 on the Socialist Party list and received over 3000 votes. The Socialist Party conquered 15 seats and as a consequence Siderius was not elected.

Siderius is a member of the Reformed Churches in the Netherlands (Liberated).

References

1981 births
Living people
People from Oost Gelre
Reformed Churches (Liberated) Christians from the Netherlands
Socialist Party (Netherlands) politicians
Members of the House of Representatives (Netherlands)
Municipal councillors of Zwolle
HU University of Applied Sciences Utrecht alumni
21st-century Dutch politicians
21st-century Dutch women politicians